Song of the Stallion is the seventh studio album by composer and guitarist Robbie Basho, released in 1971 by Takoma Records.

Track listing

Personnel
Adapted from the Song of the Stallion liner notes.

Musicians
 Robbie Basho – steel-string acoustic guitar, vocals
 William Wright – tabla

Production and additional personnel
 Ed Bogus – production
 Bob DeSousa – engineering, production
 Nancy Donald – design, photography

Release history

References

1971 albums
Robbie Basho albums
Takoma Records albums